Oyuktaş is a village in the Kozluk District, Batman Province, Turkey. Its population is 648 (2021).

The hamlet of Yeşilyurt is attached to the village.

References

Villages in Kozluk District